Robin Farina (born September 3, 1977) is a road cyclist from the United States. She made her road racing debut in 2006, transitioning from a mountain biking background. She won in 2011 the United States National Road Race Championships. She represented her country at the 2011 UCI Road World Championships and 2011 Pan American Games. With her team BMW p/b Happy Tooth Dental she participated in the team time trial at the 2015 UCI Road World Championships.

Biography
In 2013, Farina and Janel Holcomb co-founded the Women's Cycling Association, a United States-based lobby group of professional cyclists and other supporters, established to create a unified voice that could raise the profile and financial viability of women's professional cycling. Farina served as Team Director of the Happy Tooth Dental Professional Racing team during the 2016 season.

Major Results

National road cycling championships
2011 United States National Road Race Championships (Georgia, USA)
1st, Women's Elite Road Race

UCI Para-cycling Track World Championships
2017 UCI Para-cycling Track World Championships (Los Angeles, CA, USA)
5th, Women's Tandem Individual Pursuit. Shawn Cheshire (stoker), Robin Farina (pilot)
11th, Women's Tandem 1 km Time Trial. Shawn Cheshire (stoker), Robin Farina (pilot)

Cyclocross & Gravel Road Races
2016 Lost & Found Gravel Road Race
1st, Women's Elite
2015 Lost & Found Gravel Road Race
1st, Women's Elite

References

External links
 
 
 

1977 births
Living people
American female cyclists
Place of birth missing (living people)
American people of Italian descent
Cyclists at the 2011 Pan American Games
Pan American Games competitors for the United States
People from Atlanta
21st-century American women